William Wood (28 December 1927 – July 2010) was an English professional footballer who played as a full-back for Sunderland.

References

1927 births
2010 deaths
Footballers from Barnsley
English footballers
Association football fullbacks
Sunderland A.F.C. players
Hull City A.F.C. players
Sheffield United F.C. players
Wisbech Town F.C. players
English Football League players